"Good Little Girls" is the debut song recorded by American country music duo Blue County.  It was released in September 2003 as the first single from their debut album Blue County.  The song was written by Troy Seals and Brett Jones.

Chart performance
"Good Little Girls" debuted at number 51 on the U.S. Billboard Hot Country Songs chart for the week of October 18, 2003.

Year-end charts

References

2003 debut singles
2003 songs
Blue County (duo) songs
Songs written by Troy Seals
Songs written by Brett Jones (songwriter)
Song recordings produced by Dann Huff
Song recordings produced by Doug Johnson (record producer)
Curb Records singles